Al Steinfeld (born October 28, 1958) is a former American football guard, center and tackle. He played for the Kansas City Chiefs in 1982 and for the New York Giants and Houston Oilers in 1983.

References

1958 births
Living people
American football offensive guards
American football centers
American football offensive tackles
LIU Post Pioneers football players
Kansas City Chiefs players
New York Giants players
Houston Oilers players